Narachai Intha-naka (born February 20, 1999) is a retired Thai professional footballer who plays as a midfielder.

Honours

International
Thailand U-23
 2019 AFF U-22 Youth Championship: Runner up

References

External links
 

1999 births
Living people
Narachai Intha-naka
Association football midfielders
Narachai Intha-naka
Narachai Intha-naka
Narachai Intha-naka